The qualifying rounds for the 2006 FIBA Africa Clubs Champions Cup were played in two groups, in Kinshasa and Abidjan, respectively, each group qualifying four teams for the final round, played in Lagos, Nigeria.

Teams

Group A

Group B

See also
 2006 FIBA Africa Basketball Club Championship squads

References

FIBA Africa Clubs Champions Cup